Wheeling Ohio County Airport  is a public airport serving Wheeling and Ohio County, West Virginia, United States. It is eight miles (13 km) northeast of downtown Wheeling and is owned by the Ohio County Commission.

History
The first passenger airline flights were TWA and Capital DC-3s in 1947; All American Airways arrived in 1949. Lake Central arrived at the beginning of 1961 and TWA and Capital left that year. Allegheny was replaced by Allegheny Commuter in 1969-70 and Wheeling lost all service ten years later. Lake Central Airlines served Wheeling until their merger with Allegheny Airlines in 1968. It wasn't Allegheny Commuter that served Wheeling, but Allegheny, until they stopped service in 1970. According to the April 26, 1970 Allegheny timetable, AL had two round trips to Pittsburgh, using their own CV-580 prop jets. 1970 was the last year with local carrier airline service. In the later 1970s two commuter carriers started round trip service PIT-HLG within days of each other, providing up to seven departures a day. Aeromech (Clarksburg WV) and Christman Air System (Washington, PA) used EMB 110 planes (18 passengers), and Christman used Beech 99s (15 seats). Neither service lasted very long, due to lack of demand.

Facilities
(1,525 x 46 m) and 16/34 is 4,499 x 150 ft. (1,371 x 46 m).

In the year ending July 15, 2004 the airport had 52,832 aircraft operations, average 144 per day: 53% general aviation, 45% military and 2% air taxi. 64 aircraft are based at this airport: 47% single engine, 19% ultralights, 19% military, 13% multi-engine and 3% jet.

References

External links 
 Wheeling-Ohio County Airport at West Virginia DOT Airport Directory
 
 

Airports in West Virginia
Buildings and structures in Ohio County, West Virginia
Transportation in Ohio County, West Virginia